Eugen Maucher (July 16, 1912 – December 4, 1991) was a German politician of the Christian Democratic Union (CDU) and former member of the German Bundestag.

Life 
In 1946 he was co-founder of the CDU Gaisbeuren. In the 1960s he was chairman of the CDU district association of Biberach.

Maucher was a member of the municipal council of Biberach an der Riß from 1951 to 1972. From 1947 to 1952 he was a member of the state parliament for Württemberg-Hohenzollern for the Biberach constituency and then from 1952 to 11 July 1958 of the state parliament of Baden-Württemberg. His successor became Eugen Braun. Maucher was a member of the German Bundestag from 1953 to 16 September 1956 and from 30 January 1958, when he succeeded the late Josef Brönner, until 1976.

Literature

References

1912 births
1991 deaths
People from Bad Waldsee
People from the Kingdom of Württemberg
Members of the Bundestag for the Christian Democratic Union of Germany
Members of the Bundestag for Baden-Württemberg
Members of the Bundestag 1953–1957
Members of the Bundestag 1957–1961
Members of the Bundestag 1961–1965
Members of the Bundestag 1965–1969
Members of the Bundestag 1969–1972
Members of the Bundestag 1972–1976
Members of the Landtag of Württemberg
Members of the Landtag of Baden-Württemberg
Knights Commander of the Order of Merit of the Federal Republic of Germany
Recipients of the Order of Merit of Baden-Württemberg